The men's 4 km individual pursuit competition at the 2002 Asian Games was held on 4 and 5 October at the Geumjeong Velodrome.

Schedule
All times are Korea Standard Time (UTC+09:00)

Records

Results
Legend
DNF — Did not finish
DNS — Did not start

Qualification

1/4 finals

Heat 1

Heat 2

Heat 3

Heat 4

Summary

Finals

Final (3~4)

Final (1~2)

References

External links 
Qualification Results
Final Results

Track Men individual pursuit